We'll Meet Again is a 1943 British musical film directed by Philip Brandon and starring Vera Lynn. The plot is loosely based on the life of its star, otherwise known as Britain's "Forces' Sweetheart".

Plot
The film is set during the blitz in London.

Peggy (Vera Lynn) is a young dancer in a London music hall. When the audience are invited to stay in the hall during a raid she is invited to sing to entertain them and is praised for her singing voice. Peggy's best male friend Frank Foster is an aspiring songwriter and they work together on new tunes, largely in the big band style. Meanwhile, she encourages the young boy in the family to leave London as part of the evacuation plans.

Although she's reluctant at first to sing, she finally does, debuting with a song "After the Rain".

An old school friend, the kilt-wearing Bruce McIntosh, returns on leave from the Scots Guards and starts to seeing Peggy. However, he confesses his love is for Peggy's friend, Ruth. Peggy reunites them and sings Ave Maria at their wedding.

Peggy and her friend record a demo of a tune they wrote and it accidentally gets played on BBC radio. Frank gets a letter inviting him to the BBC but they explain they are interested only in the singer. Peggy insists, successfully, that they give Frank a contract too.

She quickly becomes a star. She makes a special radio broadcast on St Andrew's Day. She makes a dedication to Bruce and tells him he is a father, but she later is told he did not hear it as he was on patrol and is now missing in action. However it turns out he was only wounded.

Peggy and Frank give an open air concert to several hundred RAF crew, singing "Sincerely Yours" and "We'll Meet Again" and the film ends.

Cast
 Vera Lynn as Peggy Brown 
 Geraldo as Gerry 
 Patricia Roc as Ruth Cole
 Ronald Ward as Frank Foster
 Donald Gray as Bruce McIntosh 
 Frederick Leister as Mr. Hastropp 
 Betty Jardine as Miss Bohne 
 Brefni O'Rorke as Doctor Drake 
 Marian Spencer as Mrs. Crump 
 Lesley Osmond as Sally 
 Aubrey Mallalieu as Stage Door Keeper

Critical reception
TV Guide called the film "a fine morale booster which served its purpose in 1942."
Sky Movies wrote, "not a great film by a long way, but it's a rich - and rarely-seen - slice of nostalgia."

External links

References

1943 films
British black-and-white films
British musical films
1943 musical films
Battle of Britain films
1940s English-language films
1940s British films